The 1926 Bradley Indians football team was an American football team that represented Bradley Polytechnic Institute—now  known as Bradley University—during the 1926 college football season as a member of the Illinois Intercollegiate Athletic Conference (IIAC). Bradley finished the season on a 24-game winning streak dating back to a loss to Lombard on October 17, 1924. 

Fullback Francis Pope was the team's captain. Four Bradley players received first-team honors on the 1926 All-IIAC football team: Pope at fullback; Al DeCremer at left halfback; Carlson at right end; and Becker at left end.

Schedule

References

Bradley
Bradley Braves football seasons
Interstate Intercollegiate Athletic Conference football champion seasons
College football undefeated seasons
Bradley Indians football